Volland is an unincorporated community in Wabaunsee County, Kansas, United States.

History
A post office was opened in Volland in 1887. It was discontinued in 1955.

Education
The community is served by Wabaunsee USD 329 public school district.

References

Further reading

External links 

 Wabaunsee County maps: Current, Historic, KDOT

Unincorporated communities in Wabaunsee County, Kansas
Unincorporated communities in Kansas